The 2021/22 FIS Nordic Combined World Cup, organized by the International Ski Federation was the 39th Nordic Combined World Cup season for men, and the 2nd season for women. The men's competition started in Ruka, Finland and the women's competition in Lillehammer, Norway. Both competitions concluded in Schonach, Germany.

Norwegian Jarl Magnus Riiber and American Tara Geraghty-Moats are the defending overall champions from the 2020–21 season. The American will not defend her title due to the change of sport from Nordic combined to biathlon.

As of this season, women's mass start and mixed competitions are making their debut.

On 1 March 2022, following the 2022 Russian invasion of Ukraine, FIS decided to exclude athletes from Russia and Belarus from FIS competitions, with an immediate effect.

With his victory in Schonach, Jarl Magnus Riiber took his 49th World Cup win, overtaking Hannu Manninen (48 wins) in the overall standings and now is the most successful nordic combined skier in the history of the World Cup.

Map of world cup hosts 
All 11 locations hosting world cup events for men (11), for women (6) and shared (5) in this season.

Men 
 World Cup history in real time

after GUN event in Schonach (13 March 2022)

Calendar

Men's team 

 World Cup history in real time

after Sprint in Lahti (26 February 2022)

Standings

Overall

Nations Cup

Best Jumper Trophy

Best Skier Trophy

Prize money

Women 

 World Cup history in real time

after GUL event in Schonach (13 January 2022)

Calendar

Standings

Overall

Nations Cup

Best Jumper Trophy

Best Skier Trophy

Prize money

Mixed team 
World Cup history in real time

Provisional Competition Rounds (PCR)

Men

Women

Points distribution 
The table shows the number of points won in the 2021/22 FIS Nordic Combined World Cup for men and women.

Podium table by nation 
Table showing the World Cup podium places (gold–1st place, silver–2nd place, bronze–3rd place) by the countries represented by the athletes.

Achievements 
First World Cup career victory 

Men
 Terence Weber (25), in his 7th season – the WC 2 in Ruka
 Johannes Lamparter (20), in his 4th season – the WC 9 in Val di Fiemme

Women
 Gyda Westvold Hansen (19), in her 2nd season – the WC 1 in Lillehammer
 Anju Nakamura (22), in her 2nd season – the WC 7 in Schonach

First World Cup podium 

Men
 Terence Weber (25), in his 7th season – the WC 2 in Ruka – 1st place
 Julian Schmid (22), in his 4th season – the WC 6 in Otepää – 3rd place

Women
 Mari Leinan Lund (22), in her 2nd season – the WC 1 in Lillehammer – 2nd place
 Ida Marie Hagen (21), in her 1st season – the WC 3 in Otepää – 2nd place
 Ema Volavšek (19), in her 2nd season – the WC 5 in Ramsau – 2nd place
 Haruka Kasai (18), in her 1st season – the WC 7 in Schonach – 2nd place
 Annika Sieff (18), in her 2nd season – the WC 1 in Lillehammer – 3rd place
 Lisa Hirner (18), in her 2nd season – the WC 2 in Lillehammer – 3rd place
 Yuna Kasai (17), in her 2nd season – the WC 3 in Otepää – 3rd place
 Marte Leinan Lund (20), in her 2nd season – the WC 4 in Otepää – 3rd place

Number of wins this season (in brackets are all-time wins) 

Men
 Jarl Magnus Riiber – 13 (49) 
 Johannes Lamparter – 3 (3)
 Vinzenz Geiger – 2 (9) 
 Jørgen Graabak – 1 (7) 
 Terence Weber – 1 (1)  

Women
 Gyda Westvold Hansen – 7 (7) 
 Anju Nakamura – 1 (1)

Retirements 
Following are notable Nordic combined skiers who announced their retirement:

Men
 Taylor Fletcher
 Thomas Joebstl
 Lukas Klapfer
 Szczepan Kupczak
 Hideaki Nagai

Women

Notes

References 

FIS Nordic Combined World Cup
World cup
World cup